Sergio Ramos García (born 30 March 1986) is a Spanish professional footballer who plays as a centre-back for Ligue 1 club Paris Saint-Germain. Known for his aggressive play, he is widely regarded as one of the greatest defenders of all time, having formerly played for Real Madrid for sixteen seasons, winning four UEFA Champions League titles along with two UEFA European Championships and the 2010 FIFA World Cup with the Spain national team. 

After emerging through Sevilla's youth academy and spending two seasons with the senior side, Ramos moved to Real Madrid in the summer of 2005. Since then, he went on to become a mainstay for Real Madrid, and had won 22 major honours, including five La Liga titles and four UEFA Champions League titles, becoming one of La Liga's top goalscorers from a defensive position. He played a crucial part in the build-up to all four UEFA Champions League wins, being named in the competition Squad of the Season each time. He also scored the equaliser in the 93rd minute of the 2014 UEFA Champions League Final.

Ramos has been named to the FIFPro World11 eleven times; a record for a defender, and the third-most all-time. He has also been elected to the UEFA Team of the Year nine times, also a record for a defender and the third-most of any player. Additionally, Ramos has been named La Liga's Best Defender a record five times, and to the La Liga Team of the Season in 2015–16. In 2021, he joined Paris Saint-Germain on a free transfer.

Internationally, Ramos represented Spain at four World Cups and three European Championships. He won the 2010 FIFA World Cup and the UEFA European Championship in 2008 and 2012, being named to the FIFA World Cup Dream Team in 2010, and the UEFA Euro Team of the Tournament in 2012. He made his first appearance for Spain at the age of 18 and, in 2013, he became the nation's youngest player to ever reach 100 caps. Ramos currently holds the record as the most capped player in the history of the Spain national team and is his country's ninth-highest all-time goalscorer. He also holds the record of most international victories for Spain with 131 matches won. In February 2023, Ramos announced his retirement from international football.

Club career

Sevilla
Born in Camas, Seville, Andalusia, Ramos started playing at Camas CF by the age of 6, then he began his career at local side Sevilla, emerging through the club's youth system alongside Jesús Navas and Antonio Puerta. He made his first-team – and La Liga – debut on 1 February 2004, coming on as a 64th-minute substitute for Paco Gallardo in a 0–1 away loss against Deportivo La Coruña.

In the 2004–05 season, Ramos appeared in 41 games as Sevilla finished sixth and qualified to the 2005–06 UEFA Cup, scoring in home fixtures against Real Sociedad (2–1) and Real Madrid (2–2). In the 2004–05 UEFA Cup, he scored his first continental goal, heading to conclude a 2–0 win over C.D. Nacional at the Ramon Sánchez Pizjuán in the first round (4–1 aggregate).

Real Madrid

2005–09: Record transfer and early days

In the summer of 2005, Ramos was purchased by Real Madrid for €27 million, a record for a Spanish defender. He was the only Spanish player brought in during Florentino Pérez's first stint as Real's president.

At the club, Ramos was assigned the number 4 shirt, previously worn by Fernando Hierro. On 6 December 2005 he netted his first goal for the Merengues, in a 2–1 UEFA Champions League group stage loss at Olympiacos.

During his first seasons, Ramos played as centre back, being also used as an emergency defensive midfielder on occasion. However, with the arrival of Christoph Metzelder and Pepe in the 2007–08 season, he was again relocated to right back. In his first four seasons at Real Madrid, Ramos displayed a goalscoring instinct unusual to many defenders, netting more than 20 goals overall. He also received the first nine of his 24 red cards for the club, including four in his debut season. His first red card came after two bookable offences in a 1–0 away loss to Espanyol on 18 September 2005.

During the 2006–07 season, Ramos scored five goals, including one in a 3–3 El Clásico draw with Barcelona, as Real Madrid won a record 30th league title.

On 4 May 2008, he assisted Gonzalo Higuaín in the 89th minute against Osasuna in an eventual 2–1 away win, the match that sealed the club's 31st league championship. On the final day of the season, he scored twice in a 5–2 home win against already relegated Levante: one through a header, and another an individual effort; these goals taking his league tally for the 2007–08 season to five.

On 24 August 2008, Ramos scored in the 2008 Supercopa de España second leg against Valencia, making the score 2–1 in an eventual 4–2 and 6–5 aggregate win. The victory came despite Real Madrid playing with only nine men for a long period of time after Rafael van der Vaart and Ruud van Nistelrooy were sent off. Although Ramos experienced a slight dip in form during the early part of the 2008–09 season, he returned to his best and on 11 January 2009, scoring an acrobatic volley in a 3–0 triumph at Mallorca. He continued his scoring run the following week in a 3–1 home win against Osasuna.

Ramos was named in both FIFA and UEFA's 2008 Team of the Year, adding the FIFPro Team of the Year 2007–08 accolade. He also finished 21st in the European Player of the Year nomination for 2008.

2009–15: Breakout and team mainstay

2009–10 season
At the start of the 2009–10 season, Ramos was appointed as one of Real Madrid's four captains. Because Pepe had suffered a serious knee injury during this campaign, Ramos was often deployed as central defender. He scored four goals in 33 league matches; and, on 21 February 2010 he played his 200th official match for the Los Blancos against Villarreal (150 in the first division). Despite these personal highlights, Real Madrid finished the campaign without picking up any silverware.

2010–11 season

In Real Madrid's 5–0 loss at Barcelona on 29 November 2010, Ramos was sent off after kicking Lionel Messi from behind, then pushing Carles Puyol in the ensuing melée. After this ejection, he equalled Fernando Hierro's previous record of ten red cards at the club, despite having played in 264 fewer games. On 20 April 2011, Ramos started in the season's Copa del Rey final, a 1–0 win against Barcelona in Valencia. In the subsequent victory procession, while celebrating on the top of the club's bus, he accidentally lost hold of the cup, which fell under the wheels of the vehicle; the trophy was dented as a result.

2011–12 season
On 12 July 2011, Ramos extended his contract with Real Madrid until 2017. The following 25 April, in the Champions League semi-finals' second leg against Bayern Munich, he missed his penalty shootout attempt as Real Madrid lost 3–1; the league campaign ended with them winning, with a record 100 points, after a four-year wait and he was the player with most balls recovered in his team, third overall.

2012–13 season
On 9 January 2013, Ramos was sent off for a second bookable offense midway through the second half of an eventual 4–0 home win over Celta Vigo in the 2012–13 Copa del Rey. He subsequently received a four-match suspension, after it was revealed he also insulted referee Miguel Ángel Ayza Gámez. The following month, mere minutes after scoring the second goal at home against Rayo Vallecano and less than 20 minutes into the first half, he received two yellow cards within one minute in the eventual 2–0 home success, taking his red card tally with Real Madrid alone to 16; and 12 in the league.

In late February/early March 2013, due to the absence of Iker Casillas due to injury, Ramos captained Real to back-to-back wins over Barcelona in just four days: he netted the 2–1 home winner in the second game, heading home after a corner kick.

2013–14 season
On 14 December 2013, Ramos received a club record 18th red card for Real Madrid in a 2–2 draw at Osasuna, but the suspension was later lifted.

His 19th red card came in a 4–3 home defeat to Barcelona, on 23 March 2014. On 26 April, Ramos scored a header against Osasuna in La Liga at the Bernabéu, in a counter-attack which he began with a strong tackle. It was his first goal in La Liga in six months, since his volley against Levante on match-day 8. On 29 April 2014, Ramos scored two headers in four minutes in a 4–0 away win against Bayern Munich in the semi-finals of the Champions League, with the tie ending with a 5–0 aggregate score and Madrid's qualification to the final for the first time in twelve years. Ramos' brace against Bayern (4 minutes) was the fastest brace in UEFA Champions League semi-final history at the time. On 4 May, Ramos scored in the 2–2 draw with Valencia at home in La Liga with another header, scoring in back-to-back league games. Just three days later, Ramos scored his first free-kick for a 1–1 draw away to Valladolid, having scored in three consecutive La Liga matches and scoring four consecutive matches for Real Madrid for the first time. On 24 May, in the Champions League final against Atlético Madrid, he headed home in the 93rd minute to tie the game 1–1, and Real Madrid went on to win 4–1 in extra-time to claim 'La Decima', their tenth trophy in the competition; he was also chosen by fans as Man of the match. Ramos ended 2013–14 with 7 goals, which made it his highest scoring season for Real Madrid at the time.

2014–15 season
Ramos started 2014–15 season on 12 August 2014 by playing the full 90 minutes in a 2–0 win against Sevilla to win their first trophy of the season, the UEFA Super Cup. He then played the two-legged Supercopa de España final against Atlético Madrid with Los Blancos losing 2–1 on aggregate. Ramos scored his first goal of the season on 31 August in week two of La Liga, a header in a 4–2 away loss against Real Sociedad. Ramos scored his 50th Real Madrid goal which came off his knee on 8 November against Rayo Vallecano at the Bernabéu in La Liga as Real Madrid won 5–1.

He scored in both the semi-final and the final of the 2014 FIFA Club World Cup and was voted the Player of the Match in both as Real Madrid won the tournament in Morocco. Ramos was also voted the player of the tournament, winning the Golden Ball.

2015–21: Captaincy and sustained success

2015–16 season
Ramos agreed a new five-year contract with Real Madrid in August 2015, tying him to the club until 2020. He was also made captain after the transfer of Casillas to Porto. On 8 November Ramos scored his first goal of the season away to Sevilla. In scoring with an overhead kick he was forced to be substituted due to landing on his injured left shoulder.

On 20 December 2015, Ramos captained Madrid to a 10–2 victory over Rayo Vallecano, the club's highest scoring La Liga victory in 55 years. The following 13 March, he received his 20th red card for Real Madrid in a 2–1 win over Las Palmas, having earlier scored the game's opening goal with a header from an Isco corner kick. On 2 April 2016, he returned from suspension in a 2–1 victory against Barcelona at Camp Nou, where he was again sent off, receiving his 21st red card and fourth in a Clásico fixture.

Real Madrid reached the 2016 UEFA Champions League Final, where they faced Atlético Madrid. Ramos once again scored in a final, putting Real ahead in the first half. At the time, he was just the fifth player to score in two different Champions League Finals after Raúl, Samuel Eto'o, Lionel Messi and Cristiano Ronaldo. After a second-half equalizer from Atlético, he then scored a penalty in the shoot-out which resulted in Real Madrid winning 5–3; thus, he lifted his first UEFA Champions League trophy as a captain. According to author Michael Cox, he also notably "tipped the balance of the game toward Real Madrid" by tripping Yannick Carrasco up and stopping a three-on-one counter in stoppage time, with 30 seconds remaining and the score 1–1. He was named man of the match by UEFA after the game. By winning the final, Real Madrid earned the right to play against the winners of the 2015–16 UEFA Europa League, Sevilla, in the 2016 UEFA Super Cup. Ramos ended the 2015–16 season with three goals in 33 games which was his lowest goal tally and the fewest matches he played in any season at Real Madrid till then, due to ongoing injuries.

2016–17 season

Ramos started in the 2016 UEFA Super Cup in Trondheim, scoring Real Madrid's equalizing second goal of the match in the 93rd minute, and hence bringing the game into extra-time. Real Madrid were the eventual 3–2 winners, with Ramos being named man of the match. On 3 December 2016, he scored his fourth Clásico goal, an equalizer against Barcelona in a 1–1 draw at the Camp Nou in the 90th minute, extending Madrid's unbeaten run to 33 games. One week later, he scored another late goal, this time in the 92nd minute, to help Madrid claim a 3–2 victory against Deportivo La Coruña. 

On 15 January 2017, Ramos scored an own goal late in the game against Sevilla which levelled the scores at 1–1. Eventually Real Madrid lost the match 2–1 in stoppage time, thus ending their unbeaten streak at 40 matches. A week later, he scored both goals in a 2–1 win over Málaga, registering his 50th goal in La Liga. On 11 February, in a 3–1 victory against Osasuna, Ramos played his 500th match with the club. In the UEFA Champions League round of 16 second leg, Ramos scored an important equalizing header against Napoli in a 3–1 away win as Real Madrid qualified to the quarter-final after winning 6–2 on aggregate. On 12 March, Ramos scored another late header winner for Real Madrid, this time against Real Betis at the Santiago Bernabéu in a 2–1 win, taking his goal tally to 10 for the season – scoring double digit goals in a season for the first time in his career. Ramos' winner put Real Madrid back at the top of the La Liga table. On 23 April, Ramos was sent off for the 22nd time in his Real Madrid career and fifth time in an El Clásico, after a straight red card for a two-footed challenge on Lionel Messi during a Barcelona counter-attack in their 3–2 home defeat. Real Madrid won their 33rd La Liga title, giving Ramos his fourth league title overall and first as captain. They went on to win their first league and European Cup double since 1957–58 season, as the team defeated Juventus in the 2017 UEFA Champions League Final. This also made Ramos the first player to captain a team to back-to-back European Cups in the UEFA Champions League era. His ten goals in 2016–17 made it his then-highest scoring season.

2017–18 season

On 20 August 2017, in Real Madrid's first game of the 2017–18 La Liga, he received his 23rd career red card. It was his 18th in La Liga, a joint highest record. He went on to break that record, seeing his 19th La Liga red in a 0–0 draw with Athletic Bilbao. Ramos scored his first goal of the season on 13 September in the Champions League, scoring a bicycle kick against APOEL on match-day 1. In La Liga, Ramos scored four goals, including two penalties – against Leganes and Sevilla. During the 2017–18 UEFA Champions League, he made eleven appearances, while scoring one goal, when Madrid won their third consecutive and 13th overall Champions League title. Ramos' performance in the final, however, was met with criticism; a challenge on Mohamed Salah resulted in the Egyptian dislocating his shoulder and missing the rest of the game, and he hit Liverpool keeper Loris Karius in the head with his elbow, the goalkeeper later being diagnosed with concussion. Ramos later denied that he intentionally hit Karius, saying that Virgil van Dijk pushed him into Karius. Ramos became the first player to captain a team to three consecutive Champions League triumphs, having now lifted the Champions League in every season as captain.

2018–19 season
Ramos began the 2018–19 season scoring a penalty in an eventual 4–2 loss to Atlético Madrid in the 2018 UEFA Super Cup. Taking the penalty ensured Ramos would be the team's new penalty taker with the departure of Cristiano Ronaldo. On 26 August 2018, Ramos scored another penalty in Real Madrid's 4–1 away win against Girona, making him the only player along with Lionel Messi to score in each of the last 15 La Liga seasons. One week later, Ramos scored his third penalty of the season, against Leganes in a 4–1 win at the Santiago Bernabéu – his first goal at home since March 2017.

On 20 October 2018, Ramos played his 400th La Liga match for Real Madrid in a 2–1 loss at home to Levante, becoming only the tenth Real Madrid player to reach this milestone. After a run of poor results and the sacking of Julen Lopetegui, Ramos scored his first goal for Real Madrid in two months through a Panenka, against Real Valladolid in Santiago Solari's first 2018–19 La Liga game in charge of Los Blancos. Two weeks later, on 11 November, Ramos scored another Panenka against Celta Vigo – making them the 25th different team he scored against in La Liga. This was Ramos' third Panenka from his last four penalties, with the inventor of the penalty, Antonín Panenka, saying Ramos was the best 'imitator' of his penalty technique. With five goals in the first three months of the season, Ramos had his best goal-scoring start to a season at Real Madrid. In the 2018 FIFA Club World Cup, Ramos played in both Real Madrid's semi-final against Kashima Antlers and the final against Al Ain. Ramos scored a header in the final as Real Madrid won 3–1 to claim their third consecutive FIFA Club World Cup. Ramos became the first player to lift three consecutive FIFA Club World Cups while also becoming the first defender to score in two Club World Cup Finals.

On 9 January 2019, Ramos scored a penalty in the Copa del Rey game against Leganés, which was his 100th career goal, excluding 2 goals for Sevilla's reserve team. To celebrate the goal, Ramos chose to show the number 100 with his fingers. On 24 January, Ramos scored a brace against Girona in the Copa del Rey quarter-final first leg in a 4–2 home win. It was Ramos' fourth brace for Real Madrid and his first in the Copa del Rey. Three days later, Ramos scored his 10th goal of the campaign with a header against Espanyol in a 4–2 away win, which was also his 60th La Liga goal. With ten goals to his name, Ramos equalled his highest-scoring season at Real Madrid which he set in 2016–17.

On 6 February 2019, Sergio Ramos was playing in the Clásico for the 40th time. Three days later, in the Madrid Derby against Atlético Madrid, Ramos scored his eighth penalty of the season and his 11th goal in all competitions – making it his best goal-scoring season at Real Madrid. Four days later, in the 2–1 Champions League Round of 16 first leg away win over Ajax, Ramos became just the seventh player to play 600 matches for Real Madrid. In the match against Ajax, Ramos was booked for what seemed to be a needless challenge in the 90th minute. The booking meant that Ramos would miss the second leg against Ajax at the Santiago Bernabéu due a suspension of accumulating yellow cards. This sparked controversy after Ramos hinted to journalists in a post match interview that the yellow card was deliberate, which violates UEFA's rules. Two and a half weeks later, UEFA opened a disciplinary investigation regarding this matter and decided to give Ramos a two-game ban, meaning he will also miss both the Champions League Round of 16-second leg against Ajax and the quarter-final first leg were Real Madrid to qualify. Due to Real Madrid's elimination by Ajax, the suspension carried onto the next season and Ramos missed the first Champions League game of the 2019–20 season against Paris Saint-Germain.

On 17 February, Ramos played his 601st match for Real Madrid, against Girona in La Liga, equalling the record of Real Madrid legends Fernando Hierro and Paco Gento. Ten days later, Ramos played in his 41st El Clásico, in the Copa del Rey semi-final second leg at home. This was Ramos' 602nd match for Real Madrid, taking up to him fifth in Real Madrid's all-time appearances list. On 2 March, Ramos played in the La Liga El Clásico at the Bernabéu, making him equal the all-time record of Paco Gento, Manolo Sanchís and Xavi by playing in 42 Clasicos. On 5 March, Real Madrid were eliminated from the Champions League by Ajax after being thrashed 4–1 at the Santiago Bernabéu (aggregate 5–3 for Ajax). Ramos did not feature due to being suspended after forcing a yellow card in the first leg, thus facing criticism for doing so. Moreover, Ramos faced even more criticism as he was caught with a camera crew in the stands, filming for his new Amazon Prime documentary. Ramos took to his Twitter and Instagram accounts to discuss the controversy surrounding his actions in which he admitted forcing the yellow card against Ajax in the first leg 'was an error and I take the blame 200%'. Regarding filming the documentary, Ramos claimed there were 'certain commitments' made prior and he did not imagine the game would pan out as it did. Ramos picked up a calf injury at the start of April which saw him miss the rest of the campaign and the final eight La Liga matches.

2019–20 season 

Ramos' first goal of the season was a header in his first Champions League match of the campaign, against Club Brugge on 1 October at home. The goal came at a vital time as Real Madrid were 2–0 down by half-time but were able to make a comeback after another header by Casemiro. This was also Ramos' first Champions League goal in two seasons. On 30 October, Ramos scored from the penalty-spot in a 5–0 home victory over Leganés, continuing his run of scoring in 16 straight La Liga seasons, again equalling Messi. One week later, on 6 November, Ramos scored his first penalty in the Champions League, which came against Galatasaray in a 6–0 home win. It was another 'Panenka' style penalty and also meant that Ramos scored in two Champions League group matches in the same season for the first time. On 18 December, Ramos played in his 43rd El Clasico, claiming the all-time appearance record for this historic fixture.

On 12 January 2020, Ramos scored the winning penalty in a shoot-out against Atletico Madrid in the Supercopa de España final in Jeddah as Real Madrid won 4–1 on penalties after a 0–0 draw after extra time. This was the first time in Ramos' career that he scored a winning penalty in a shoot-out. The 2020 Supercopa title was Ramos' 21st trophy with Real Madrid. A month later, Ramos scored another header in La Liga, this time away to Osasuna as Real Madrid won 4–1 to maintain top position in the table. Ramos' goal at El Sadar meant that he had scored in 20 different La Liga stadiums. This was Ramos' first La Liga goal of 2020, meaning he was the only player to score in La Liga in each of the last 17 calendar years – dating back to 2004.

On 26 February 2020, Ramos equalled the record of red cards received in the UEFA Champions League. With four red cards, he shares the unwanted record with Zlatan Ibrahimović and Edgar Davids. This dismissal came in a 2–1 home defeat to Manchester City in the Round of 16 first leg, for a tactical foul on City striker Gabriel Jesus. Four days later, Ramos featured in Real Madrid's 2–0 win over Barcelona at home in La Liga to leapfrog them into first place. This was Ramos' 21st consecutive Clasico in all competitions and his 30th in La Liga with Real Madrid.

When La Liga restarted after a three-month hiatus due to the COVID-19 pandemic, Ramos scored in Real Madrid's first game back against Eibar on 14 June at the Alfredo di Stéfano Stadium in a 3–1 win. He also scored the first goal at this stadium in its inaugural match in May 2006. Ramos' goal began with him winning the ball back from Eibar's attack a few meters outside Madrid's own penalty area and ran 70 meters across the pitch to find the pass from Eden Hazard to score his first La Liga goal from open play in over five years. On 21 June, Ramos scored a penalty for Real Madrid in their 2–1 win against Real Sociedad at the Anoeta, which was the 20th consecutive penalty he converted for club and country (including shoot-outs). Three days later, Ramos scored a free-kick against in a 2–0 win over Mallorca at the Alfredo di Stefano to become La Liga's all-time highest scoring defender with 68 goals, surpassing Ronald Koeman's 67 with Barcelona. Ramos' free-kick was also his eighth La Liga goal of the season, making it his most prolific league campaign to date and his tenth in all competitions – hitting double figures for a third season. On 28 June, Ramos featured in the 1–0 away league win against Espanyol, heading the ball down right outside the Espanyol penalty area to Karim Benzema who eventually assisted Casemiro to score the winner right before half-time. This was Ramos' 645th match for Madrid, moving him up to fourth in the club's all-time most appearances list joint with Santillana. On 2 July, Ramos scored his fifteenth consecutive penalty for Real Madrid in the 79th minute which proved to be the winner in a narrow 1–0 home win against Getafe – opening up a four-point advantage at the top of La Liga. This was Ramos' ninth league goal of the season – equaling the record set by Argentine international defender Ezequiel Garay in 2006-07 while playing for Racing Santander for a defender with the most goals in a single La Liga season. The penalty against Getafe meant that Ramos had equalled his best goal scoring season (11 goals) which was set last season. Ramos had now scored in four out of six of Madrid's matches since the restart, more than any other player. Moreover, the goal was his 100th career club goal, and his 70th in La Liga. The win over Getafe was Ramos' 450th La Liga appearance as a Real Madrid player, becoming just the fifth player to reach this milestone. Three days later, he scored another penalty – his 22nd in a row, and his tenth goal of the season in La Liga – in a 1–0 away win over Athletic Bilbao. He also became the first centre-back to score 10 goals in a La Liga season since Fernando Hierro during the 1993–94 season. On 19 July, Ramos scored his eleventh league goal in Real Madrid's last La Liga game of the season against Leganes in an eventual 2–2 draw, making it his most prolific season in White with 13 goals across all competitions. At the end of the season, Ramos won his fifth league title with Los Blancos and Real Madrid's 34th overall.

2020–21: Final season at Real Madrid 
On 27 September 2020, Ramos opened his goal count for the season after netting the winning goal against Real Betis from the penalty spot at Benito Villamarín in a 3–2 league win. One month later on 24 October in El Clasico, Ramos earned and converted a penalty at the Camp Nou in a 3–1 league win – this was his 25th consecutive penalty goal for both club and country (including shoot-outs). Ramos' fifth El Clasico goal equaled the record of Ronald Koeman (who was in the other dugout as manager) as the defenders with the most goals in this historic fixture. This was also Ramos' 31st consecutive La Liga Clasico, meaning he has not missed one since joining Los Blancos in 2005 – equalling Raúl and Paco Gento as the players who played in the most league Clasicos. Three days later, Ramos played his first Champions League match of the season against Borussia Mönchengladbach, assisting Casemiro's 93rd minute equaliser in a 2–2 draw. This was Ramos' 16th Champions League campaign with Real Madrid, equalling the record of club legend, and former captain and teammate Iker Casillas. On 31 October, Ramos became just the 10th player to play 500 La Liga matches (461 for Real Madrid and 39 for Sevilla), as Madrid beat Huesca 4–1 at the Alfredo Di Stefano Stadium. On 3 November, Ramos scored his 100th goal for Real Madrid in all competitions, in a 3–2 win over Inter Milan in the Champions League. 

On 14 January, Ramos reportedly took four pain killer injections to his left knee to play against Athletic Bilbao in the 2020–21 Supercopa de España semi-final which Real Madrid went on to lose 2–1. This was the last match Ramos would play before opting for a mid-season surgery for the first time in his career for a torn meniscus in his left knee. He was expected to be out for two months and to return in early April, but after a speedy recovery, Ramos started against Elche on 13 March – just over a month after he went under the knife. Real Madrid's 2–1 win over Elche was Ramos' 334th La Liga win (315 with Real Madrid and 19 with Sevilla), equalling the record of Iker Casillas as the players with second–most wins in the Spanish top flight – only behind Messi. Four days later, Ramos played in a Champions League round of 16-second leg for the first time in three years as Real Madrid went on to defeat Atalanta 3–1 at the Alfredo di Stefano (5–3 on aggregate) and qualified for the quarter-finals for the first time since their last Champions League winning campaign in 2018. Ramos scored his 19th consecutive penalty for Madrid in the 60th minute which killed the game, before coming off as a substitute. This was Ramos' 15th Champions League goal, equalling Gerard Piqué and former teammate Iván Helguera as the second highest scoring defenders in the history of the competition – with only former teammate Roberto Carlos ahead of them. Due to an injury, Ramos missed his first El Clásico since joining Los Blancos, putting an end to a streak of playing in 31 consecutive league Clásicos. He later missed the second leg of the Champions League quarter-finals against Liverpool, as he tested positive for COVID-19, although he was also injured. On 5 May, in the Champions League semi-final second leg against Chelsea, his side lost 2–0 and were eliminated from the competition; however, he then sustained an injury in his left hamstring which forced him to miss the rest of the season; this meant he had played his last game for Real Madrid. Ramos played just 21 matches for Los Blancos in 2020–21, making it his most injury-riddled season, after having played at least 33 matches in each of his previous 15 campaigns at the club.

On 16 June, Real Madrid announced that Ramos would leave the club after 16 years. During his farewell event on the next day, Ramos, who had initially asked for a two-year offer, mentioned that he accepted a one-year contract renewal with a salary reduction; however, the offer had expired without his knowledge.

Paris Saint-Germain

2021–22: Transfer to PSG 

On 8 July 2021, it was announced that Ramos had signed a two-year contract with Paris Saint-Germain. He chose to wear the number 4 jersey, with Thilo Kehrer switching to the number 24 shirt. Ramos remarked: "I am quite superstitious about it and I love the number 4 because I have worn that number since the start of my career and it has followed me throughout my career and my life, bringing with me much luck and many victories." During the medical examination required to complete the signing, the medical staff at PSG were reported to be impressed by his seriousness and physique, whilst the medical results were noted to be excellent and incredible. The staff compared Ramos' physique to that of a 25-year-old (he was 35 at the time).

Due to a series of injury problems, Ramos made his first appearance in a matchday squad for PSG ahead of a Champions League group stage game against Manchester City on 24 November 2021. He made his debut four days later in a 3–1 league victory over Saint-Étienne. On 23 January 2022, Sergio scored his debut goal for the club, helping PSG to beat Reims 4–0 in a home league match. Ramos won the 2021–22 Ligue 1 in his first season at the club.

2022–23: Second season at PSG 
PSG started the 2022–23 season by winning the 2022 Trophée des Champions in Tel Aviv, in which Ramos scored a goal in a 4–0 win over Nantes. On 6 September 2022, he made his Champions League debut with PSG in a 2–1 win over Juventus.

International career

Early international career and 2006 FIFA World Cup
In 2004, Ramos became an instant hit for Spain's under-19, for whom he played six international matches. During the 2004 U19 Euro, Ramos was a key figure for Spain as he started in four out of five of their matches on the way to winning their second U19 European Championship, including scoring a decisive penalty in the Semi-final penalty-shoot out against Ukraine. On 26 March 2005, in a 3–0 friendly win over China in Salamanca, he first appeared for the senior side at only 18 years and 361 days of age, making him the youngest player to play for the national team in the last 55 years. He held this record until 1 March 2006, when it was broken by Cesc Fàbregas in a friendly match against Côte d'Ivoire.

On 12 October 2005, Ramos scored his first two international goals in a 6–0 away thrashing of San Marino for the 2006 FIFA World Cup qualifiers. He was selected for the final stages in Germany and, after the international retirement of Real Madrid teammate Míchel Salgado, became the undisputed first-choice right-back. Despite wearing the number 4 jersey for Real Madrid, Ramos admitted he wears the number 15 for Spain in memory of his close friend and former Sevilla teammate Puerta, who died in August 2007 and made his Spain debut wearing No. 15.

Euro 2008

Throughout Spain's UEFA Euro 2008 qualifying campaign, Ramos was a regular member of the starting eleven as the national side finished first in its group, above Sweden. He scored two goals, including one in a 3–1 away win over Denmark, in 11 appearances. In the tournament's final stages, Ramos played in all matches and minutes, except the 2–1 group stage win against Greece. In the final, his pass nearly set up Marcos Senna's first international goal, but the latter missed his opportunity by inches. During the celebrations after the 1–0 defeat of Germany, he wore a T-shirt in honour of his late friend Puerta.

2009 FIFA Confederations Cup and 2010 FIFA World Cup
Ramos was selected in the squad for the 2009 FIFA Confederations Cup in South Africa, as Spain finished in third. On 3 June 2010, he captained Spain for the first time, in a 1–0 friendly win over South Korea in Innsbruck, Austria.

At the 2010 World Cup, held in the same country, Ramos played every minute of the tournament as a right back, helping Spain keep five clean sheets and reach the final, which they won 1–0 against the Netherlands; he topped the tournament's Castrol Performance Index with a score of 9.79. Despite playing at right-back, he also completed more solo runs than any other player in the tournament, 31.

Euro 2012

Ramos returned to the heart of the defence for Euro 2012. When asked about his role change, he replied: "I have adapted and feel comfortable in the middle, but I am a World and European champion at right-back". He played all the games in Poland and Ukraine alongside Barcelona's Gerard Piqué and, in the semi-finals against Portugal, he converted his penalty shootout attempt in an eventual 4–2 win (0–0 after 120 minutes), scoring for the eventual champions in Panenka-style. On 1 July, Ramos won his third trophy with the Spanish senior National Team as they thrashed Italy 4–0 in the Final. Ramos' performances during the Euro earned him a place in the Team of The Tournament. Ramos wore another T-shirt during Spain's Euro 2012 celebrations to pay homage to his late friend Puerta.

2013 FIFA Confederations Cup and 2014 FIFA World Cup

On 22 March 2013, Ramos celebrated his 100th cap by opening the scoring in a 1–1 draw with Finland in Gijón for the 2014 World Cup qualifiers. He became the youngest European player ever to reach that figure in the process, surpassing Germany's Lukas Podolski. In June, Ramos contested in the 2013 FIFA Confederations Cup in Brazil, starting every match as Spain lost to the hosts in the final. He captained the side for their second group game, a 10–0 win over Tahiti at the Maracanã, which is the biggest win of his career. On 30 June, he missed a penalty kick in the 3–0 Confederations Cup Final loss to Brazil.

Ramos was selected for his third World Cup in 2014. He played the full 90 minutes of each of the team's matches in Brazil, each with a different partner in central defence, as the reigning champions were eliminated from the group stage.

Euro 2016 and 2018 FIFA World Cup

In February 2016, Ramos won the Luis Aragonés Award by Marca which distinguished him as the best player of the national team in the past year. With David de Gea selected ahead of Iker Casillas in Spain's starting line-up, Ramos captained the team at UEFA Euro 2016. On 21 June 2016, he had a penalty kick saved by Danijel Subašić in a 2–1 loss to Croatia. Spain finished their Euro group as runners-up and crashed out in the Round of 16 against Italy.

On 23 March 2018, days before turning 32, Ramos earned his 150th cap for Spain in a 1–1 friendly draw with Germany in Düsseldorf. Only Iker Casillas had previously reached the mark for the team.

Ramos was included in the Spain squad for the 2018 FIFA World Cup and would go into his fourth tournament, and first World Cup as Captain after Iker Casillas missed out. He played in all three of Spain's Group stage matches as they topped the 'Group of Death' ahead of European Champions Portugal. In the Round of 16 against Russia, Ramos believed he scored the opening goal but it was later credited as an Sergei Ignashevich own goal. The match ended 1–1 after extra time and was decided on penalties (4–3) as the hosts eliminated La Roja. Ramos scored Spain's fourth penalty but it wasn't enough as teammates Koke and Aspas both had their penalties saved.

2018–19 UEFA Nations League and Euro 2020 qualification
With new coach Luis Enrique, Ramos retained captaincy of the national team. He played in all four of Spain's 2018–19 UEFA Nations League group matches, becoming the nation's top scorer in the group with three goals – scoring once against England and twice against Croatia. Spain finished second in their UEFA Nations League Group, which saw them miss out on the 2019 UEFA Nations League Finals. In March 2019, Ramos scored the winner in Spain's first UEFA Euro 2020 qualifying match against Norway through another Panenka penalty in a 2–1 win. This was his tenth penalty of the season, scoring them all. It was also his fifth consecutive match scoring for Spain, which is a personal record. Spain manager Enrique hailed Ramos as a 'unique player in history' after the match.

In the second Euro 2020 qualification match, away to Malta, Ramos did not score for the first time in six matches for Spain – failing to extend his scoring streak. However, the match ended 2–0 to Spain which was his 121st win with La Roja, equaling the all-time record of Iker Casillas. On 7 June 2019, Ramos broke the record of most international victories with 122, following a 4–1 victory against the Faroe Islands, scoring Spain's opening goal in the process. Three days later, ahead of the match against Sweden, Ramos received a plaque from the Spanish Football Federation to commemorate his record. The match ended with a 3–0 win for Spain, where he scored the first goal and extended his tally to 123 international victories. On 5 September 2019, Ramos scored from a penalty kick his 21st international goal to open the score in Spain's 2–1 away win over Romania in a Euro 2020 qualifier, which made him the joint 10th top scorer in the history of the national team, alongside Míchel. On 8 September, Ramos won his 167th cap for Spain in a 4–0 home win over the Faroe Islands in a Euro 2020 qualifier; with this appearance, he equaled Iker Casillas as Spain's most capped player of all time. On 12 October 2019, he became the nation's sole most capped player.

2020–21 UEFA Nations League and 2022 FIFA World Cup qualification
On 6 September 2020, Ramos scored a brace in a 4–0 win over Ukraine for the 2020–21 UEFA Nations League, reaching 23 international goals and equaling Alfredo Di Stéfano as Spain's eighth-highest all-time goalscorer. On 14 November 2020, in a 1–1 draw against Switzerland, he made his 177th appearance for Spain and overtook Gianluigi Buffon's record for the most international caps received by a European player.

Ramos made his last international appearance on 31 March 2021 as an 86th-minute substitute in a 3–1 home 2022 FIFA World Cup qualifying victory against Kosovo.

UEFA Euro 2020 and 2022 FIFA World Cup squad exclusions and retirement
Ramos was excluded from the squad for UEFA Euro 2020, following an injury-plagued season. His omission marked the first major tournament since Euro 2004 where he was not called for the national team, ending a run of featuring in ten consecutive tournaments. A year and a half later, he was excluded from the squad for the 2022 FIFA World Cup.

Ramos announced his retirement from international football on 23 February 2023 at the age of 36, having not appeared for his country in nearly two years, after new coach Luis de la Fuente told him he would no longer be selected.

Player profile

Style of play
Regarded as one of the best defenders in the world, and of all time, Ramos is a physically strong player who excels in the air due to his elevation, eye for goal, and heading accuracy, making him a goal threat on set-pieces; he is also a competent and aggressive tackler. In addition to his defensive skills and goal scoring ability, he is gifted with pace, and is comfortable on the ball, possessing good technical ability, as well as good distribution, passing, and crossing ability, which allows him to carry the ball forward, switch the play with long balls, or play out from the back on the ground. According to Spanish sports newspaper Marca, FIFA's official records confirmed that in 2015, Ramos was clocked at a sprinting speed of 30.6 kilometers per hour, making him one of the fastest footballers in the world at the time. He is also an accurate penalty taker, and is known for often using the Panenka technique when taking them. He has also been known to take free kicks, courtesy of his ability to bend the ball and his powerful striking ability from distance.

Ramos has earned plaudits for his leadership, athleticism, technical prowess, and his ability to excel both offensively and defensively, as well as his versatility, which allows him to be deployed as a centre-back and as a full-back; in his youth, he often played as a right-back, while he later established himself as a centre-back as his career progressed. Due to his wide range of skills, his former Real Madrid manager Carlo Ancelotti has compared him to legendary defender Paolo Maldini; he went on to describe him as "the best defender in the world at the moment" in 2014, a view which was echoed by Giorgio Chiellini in 2020. Ramos has also occasionally been deployed as a central or defensive midfielder, in particular under Ancelotti during the 2014–15 season. Ramos has been praised for his decisive performances in important games, most notably for Real Madrid, due to his tendency to score crucial goals for his team, and is considered by several pundits to be one of the most reliable performers in high-pressure situations. However, despite his ability as a defender, his tactical sense, consistency, and concentration from match to match have been questioned at times by pundits and other footballing figures, who have accused him of being too impulsive in his challenges or prone to occasional defensive errors throughout the course of a season.

Ramos is also often criticised in the media for using excessive, reckless force while playing, as well as for his lack of discipline and tendency to pick-up an excessive number of unnecessary cards; he has also been accused of diving.

Disciplinary record
Ramos holds multiple disciplinary records, for Real Madrid, in the Champions League, La Liga, El Clásico, and in the Spain national team.

Ramos holds the record for most carded player in La Liga, with 191 cards. His 171 yellow cards surpass Alberto Lopo, the former record holder for La Liga yellow cards. The remaining 20 are red cards, making Ramos the most sent-off player in La Liga as well. His La Liga card record is higher than any other player's in the major European leagues, making him the most booked player in all major European top divisions.

In the Champions League, Ramos has amassed 40 yellow cards and 4 red cards (3 of which were straight red cards), making him both the most-carded player and joint-most red-carded player in Champions League history.

Lastly, Ramos also holds the record for being the most carded player in the history of the Spanish national team, with 24 yellow cards.

Personal life
Ramos entered in a relationship with journalist/presenter Pilar Rubio in September 2012. This was confirmed by both at the FIFA Ballon d'Or. They have four sons together. On 16 July 2018, Ramos and Rubio got engaged. The couple married in his hometown of Seville on 15 June 2019.

Ramos has been described as a 'family person' and has a close relationship with his siblings and parents. Rene, Ramos's brother, is currently his football agent. Ramos is a fan of bullfighting and he is a personal friend of matador Alejandro Talavante. He celebrated victories for both club and country by playing with a matador's cape. Ramos is also a keen horse aficionado, owning a stud farm in his native Andalusia specifically dedicated to the breeding of the Andalusian horse. Ramos' horse, 'Yucatán SR4' became a World Champion in 2018.

In June 2014, Ramos was appointed as an ambassador for UNICEF Spain.

Body art
Ramos has more than 42 tattoos, including Jesus and Mary, Star of David in honour of his grandmother, Nena, who gave a pendant of the same design to his mother; in addition, he also has tattoos of a lion, wolf, dreamcatcher, map of Spain, Native American chief, hamsa, FIFA World Cup and Champions League trophies, his family members, among others.

Amazon Prime documentary
In January 2019, Amazon Prime and Ramos himself announced they will release an eight-episode documentary series on Ramos' life on and off the pitch known as El Corazón de Sergio Ramos (The Heart of Sergio Ramos). This would be the first ever time the public would see the personal side of Ramos and his family. On 5 March, during Real Madrid's Champions League Round of 16 second leg match, Ramos was suspended and watched the match from his VIP area in the stands. His reactions were filmed by the Amazon Prime crew. This sparked controversy as Real Madrid lost the match and were eliminated from the Champions League, though Ramos suggested on his social media networks that there were "certain commitments made and it never remotely went through my head that the game could have turned out as it did".

Due to the success of his first docu-series with Amazon, Ramos announced in June 2020 via his social media accounts that Amazon Prime will be releasing another documentary known as La Leyenda Sergio Ramos (The Legend of Sergio Ramos), which highlights his career's most defining moments. It was released in Spain in April 2021 and will be release world-wide in June and consists of six episodes.

Career statistics

Club

International

Scores and results list Spain's goal tally first, score column indicates score after each Ramos goal.

Honours
Real Madrid
La Liga: 2006–07, 2007–08, 2011–12, 2016–17, 2019–20
Copa del Rey: 2010–11, 2013–14
Supercopa de España: 2008, 2012, 2017, 2019–20
UEFA Champions League: 2013–14, 2015–16, 2016–17, 2017–18
UEFA Super Cup: 2014, 2016, 2017
FIFA Club World Cup: 2014, 2016, 2017, 2018

Paris Saint-Germain
 Ligue 1: 2021–22
 Trophée des Champions: 2022

Spain U19
UEFA European Under-19 Championship: 2004

Spain
FIFA World Cup: 2010
UEFA European Championship: 2008, 2012
FIFA Confederations Cup runner-up: 2013; third place: 2009

Individual
 La Liga Breakthrough Player of the Year: 2005
 FIFA FIFPro World11: 2008, 2011, 2012, 2013, 2014, 2015, 2016, 2017, 2018, 2019, 2020
 UEFA Team of the Year: 2008, 2012, 2013, 2014, 2015, 2016, 2017, 2018, 2020
 FIFA World Cup Dream Team: 2010
FIFA World Cup All-Star Team: 2010
 La Liga Best Defender: 2011–12, 2012–13, 2013–14, 2014–15, 2016–17
 UEFA European Championship Team of the Tournament: 2012
 FIFA Confederations Cup Dream Team: 2013
 UEFA Champions League Squad of the Season: 2013–14, 2015–16, 2016–17, 2017–18
 FIFA Club World Cup Golden Ball: 2014
 FIFA Club World Cup top scorer: 2014
 UEFA Ultimate Team of the Year: 2015
 La Liga Team of the Season: 2015–16
 UEFA La Liga Team of the Season: 2016–17, 2019–20
 ESM Team of the Year: 2007–08, 2011–12, 2014–15, 2016–17
 UEFA Champions League Defender of the Season: 2017, 2018
 IFFHS Men's World Team: 2017, 2018, 2019, 2020
 IFFHS World Team of the Decade: 2011–2020
 IFFHS UEFA Team of the Decade: 2011–2020
 IFFHS World's Highest Scoring Defender of the Decade: 2011–2020
 IFFHS World's Highest Scoring Defender of the 21st century: 2001–2020
 Castrol Performance Index: 2010 FIFA World Cup Castrol Index Winner
 Castrol Performance Index: UEFA Euro 2012 Castrol EDGE Index Winner
 Luis Aragones Award: 2016
 Ballon d'Or Dream Team (Bronze): 2020
 L'Équipe Team of the Year: 2020
 L'Équipe Team of the Year (Fan Vote): 2020
 11Leyendas Jornal AS: 2021
 Globe Soccer Awards "Best Defender of All Time"

Discography

Notes

See also 
 List of footballers with 100 or more UEFA Champions League appearances
 List of men's footballers with 100 or more international caps
 List of Real Madrid CF records and statistics
 List of La Liga players (400+ appearances)

References

External links

Profile at the Paris Saint-Germain F.C. website

National team data at BDFutbol

1986 births
Living people
Spanish Roman Catholics
People from Camas, Seville
Sportspeople from the Province of Seville
Spanish footballers
Footballers from Andalusia
Association football defenders
Sevilla Atlético players
Sevilla FC players
Real Madrid CF players
Paris Saint-Germain F.C. players
Segunda División B players
La Liga players
Ligue 1 players
UEFA Champions League winning players
Spain youth international footballers
Spain under-21 international footballers
Spain international footballers
2006 FIFA World Cup players
UEFA Euro 2008 players
2009 FIFA Confederations Cup players
2010 FIFA World Cup players
UEFA Euro 2012 players
2013 FIFA Confederations Cup players
2014 FIFA World Cup players
UEFA Euro 2016 players
2018 FIFA World Cup players
UEFA European Championship-winning players
FIFA World Cup-winning players
FIFA Century Club
Spanish expatriate footballers
Expatriate footballers in France
Spanish expatriate sportspeople in France